The Archdiocese of Durban evolved from the Vicariate Apostolic of Natal which was erected on 15 November 1850 and elevated to an archdiocese with the title Archdiocese of Durban on 11 January 1951. As of 2002, the Church census shows that there were 217,468 Catholics in 74 parishes in the Archdiocese.

The Province of the Roman Catholic Metropolitan Archdiocese of Durban contains these suffragan dioceses:
 Dundee
 Eshowe
 Kokstad
 Marianhill
 Umtata
 Umzimkulu

Leadership
 Vicariate
 Bishop Marie Jean Francois Allard, O.M.I. (31 January 1851 – 11 June 1874)
 Bishop Charles-Constant Jolivet, O.M.I. (15 September 1874 – 15 September 1903)
 Bishop Henri Delalle, O.M.I. (19 December 1903 – 4 April 1946)
 Bishop Denis Hurley, O.M.I. (12 December 1946 – 11 January 1951)
 Archdiocese
 Archbishop Denis Hurley, O.M.I. (11 January 1951 – 29 May 1992)
 Archbishop Wilfrid Napier, OFM (29 March 1992 – 9 June 2021) (Cardinal in 2001)
 Coadjutor Archbishop Abel Gabuza (9 December 2018 – 17 January 2021)
 Archbishop Siegfried Jwara (9 june 2021 -  )
 Auxiliary Bishops
 Dominic Joseph Chwane Khumalo, O.M.I. (1978-1999)
 Jabulani Adatus Nxumalo, O.M.I. (2002-2005), appointed Archbishop of Bloemfontein
 Barry Alexander Anthony Wood, O.M.I. (2005-2017)

References

External links
 

Roman Catholic dioceses in South Africa
Religious organizations established in 1850
Roman Catholic dioceses and prelatures established in the 19th century
1850 establishments in the Colony of Natal
Durban